The 1892 Fordham football team, also known as the St. John's football team, was an American football team that represented Fordham College, also known as St. John's College, as an independent during the 1892 college football season. Under first-year head coach Harry Ely, Fordham claims a 33–7 record. No contemporaneous press report has been found for many of the games, and a newspaper report from late November 1892 stated that Fordham disbanded its team with a 3–2 record. College Football Data Warehouse (CFDW) lists the team's record at 2–2. Opponents recognized by CFDW are displayed in bold in the schedule chart below.

Schedule

References

Fordham
Fordham Rams football seasons
Fordham football